On 21 January 1939, the Imperial Airways Short Empire flying boat Cavalier, en route from New York City to Bermuda, lost power to its engines and ditched in heavy seas approximately 285 miles (459 km) southeast of New York. She subsequently sank with the loss of three lives. Ten hours later, ten survivors were picked up by the tanker Esso Baytown.

Aircraft
Cavalier was a Short Empire flying boat with the registration G-ADUU that had been launched on 21 November 1936 and delivered to Imperial Airways.

In 1937, Imperial Airways and Pan American World Airways had opened up a London-New York-Bermuda flying-boat passenger service. Imperial Airways used Cavalier on the route. Shipped by sea to Bermuda, she operated on the route for the first time on a survey flight on 25 May 1937.

Accident 
On the day of the incident, Cavalier left Port Washington on Long Island, New York, at 10:38 bound for Bermuda. At 12:23 p.m. the flying boat sent the message Running into bad weather. May have to earth, which referred to earthing the aerial; this was followed by another message at 12:27 Still in bad weather. Severe Static. Port Washington tried to call the Cavalier for the next 15 minutes but did not get a reply. At 12:57 Cavalier broadcast an SOS message followed at 12:59 by All engines failing through ice. Altitude 1,500 ft [457 m]. Forced landing in a few minutes. Another message eight minutes later said she was still flying but on two engines; four minutes after that came a series of messages to say that she had had to come down in the sea. The last message, at 13:13, was the single word Sinking.

Rescue
As soon as it was realised at Port Washington that Cavalier was going to land in the sea, Port Washington requested a Pan American World Airways Sikorsky S-42 flying boat from Hamilton, Bermuda, to go to her assistance. The United States Coast Guard sent a flying boat from Long Island to Cavaliers last known position but it did not find her. A United States Army Air Corps Boeing B-17 Flying Fortress heavy bomber made a sortie from Langley Field in Virginia to search for Cavalier but had to return before midnight without success. Other aircraft also tried in vain to find the Cavalier.

The US Coast Guard also despatched two cutters and two patrol boats to the scene; one was only 70 nautical miles (130 km) away but the other three had to come from Cape Cod, Massachusetts; New York; and Norfolk, Virginia. The commercial tanker Esso Baytown was the first to arrive at the scene of the accident and reported at 23:25 that she had sighted wreckage and had lowered her lifeboats. By listening for the sound of their cries – they were in fact singing – Esso Baytown rescued six passengers and four members of the crew who had clung together on the water for ten hours. The United States Navy gunboat  transferred a doctor to Esso Baytown but because of the high seas and darkness had to discontinue the search for any other survivors. The ten survivors were taken to New York, arriving on 23 January 1939; the other three people aboard were lost.

Report
The British Air Ministrys Inspector of Accidents reported that the accident had been caused by icing in the carburettors of all four engines. This caused a full loss of power in the inboard engines and partial loss in the outer; the commander of the Cavalier had reported icing problems prior to ditching. The inspector recommended that extra heating of carburetters and of the incoming air be provided and that a temperature indicator be installed. He also advised that passengers should be instructed in the fastening of lifebelts and the location of emergency exits and recommended the provision of extra life-saving equipment like rafts and pyrotechnic signals and that passengers should fasten safety belts at take-off and alighting.

References

Notes

Bibliography

"The Bermuda Accident" Flight 28 January 1939
"The Cavalier Report" Flight 30 March 1939 p317

Aviation accidents and incidents in 1939
Maritime incidents in 1939
Aviation accidents and incidents in the Atlantic Ocean
Accidents and incidents involving the Short Empire
Airliner accidents and incidents involving ditching
Imperial Airways accidents and incidents